U.S. Route 84 (US 84) is a  U.S. Highway in the U.S. state of Georgia, is also signed as State Route 38 for its entire length in Georgia. After entering Georgia from Alabama west-northwest of Jakin, the highway travels through the southern portion of the state, meeting its eastern terminus at Interstate 95 (I-95) east of Midway. US 84 through Georgia is also known as the Wiregrass Georgia Parkway.

Route description

After entering the state from Alabama, US 84/SR 38 travels east through Donalsonville to Bainbridge. The highways travel around the city to the south on a freeway bypass, cosigned with US 27/SR 1. The highway continues east through Cairo to Thomasville, where it bypasses downtown to the north and east, concurrent with US 319 and SR 35, then US 19/SR 3/SR 300. The highway then continues east to Quitman, where it becomes concurrent with US 221/SR 76/SR 333 to the east, past its interchange with Interstate 75 (I-75), to Valdosta. In Valdosta, US 221 departs, and US 84/SR 38 continues east-northeast to Waycross, where it is briefly concurrent with US 1, US 23, US 82, SR 4, and SR 520. US 84/SR 38 continues northeast from Waycross, traveling through Blackshear before arriving in Jesup. In Jesup, the highway becomes concurrent with US 25, US 301, and SR 23 northeast to Ludowici. In Ludowici, US 25, US 301, and SR 23 depart to the northwest, and US 84/SR 38 continues northeast to Hinesville. In Hinesville, the highway becomes concurrent with SR 196, and takes a drastic turn to the east. A short distance later, SR 196 departs, and US 84/SR 38 continues east to their eastern terminus at exit 76 on I-95 east of Midway. Here, the roadway continues as Islands Highway.

US 84 is a very significant route in southern Georgia. Almost all of the route sees an Average Annual Daily Traffic (AADT) of 5,000 vehicles or more, and the AADT exceeds 20,000 vehicles in and around Waycross and Hinesville. Because of this, most of the route is a multi-lane divided highway, especially west of Valdosta.

The entire length of US 84 in Georgia is part of the National Highway System, a system of routes determined to be the most important for the nation's economy, mobility, and defense.

History

Formerly, US 84 met its eastern terminus at US 17/SR 25 west of Brunswick, while US 82 followed the present alignment of US 84 to Midway. However, with the realignment of highways near Waycross, the terminus of the two highways were swapped. In addition, a segment of the highway between Boston and Quitman was relocated to a more northerly routing in 1966, with the former routing being renumbered as State Route 364. SR 364 was decommissioned in 1982.

Major intersections

Special routes

SR 38 Spur (Cairo)

State Route 38 Spur (SR 38 Spur) is a short west–east spur route in Cairo connecting SR 93/SR 111 in downtown with the US 84/SR 38 mainline in the eastern part of the city.

SR 38 Connector (Hinesville)

State Route 38 Connector (SR 38 Conn.) is a short west–east connecting route of SR 38. It connects SR 119 on the Hinesville–Fort Stewart line with US 84/SR 38/SR 196 in northeast Hinesville just west of the Hinesville–Flemington line. It is known as General Stewart Way for its entire length. The entire length of SR 38 Conn. is part of the National Highway System.

See also

Special routes of U.S. Route 84

References

External links

 Georgia
84
Transportation in Early County, Georgia
Transportation in Seminole County, Georgia
Transportation in Decatur County, Georgia
Transportation in Grady County, Georgia
Transportation in Thomas County, Georgia
Transportation in Brooks County, Georgia
Transportation in Lowndes County, Georgia
Transportation in Lanier County, Georgia
Transportation in Clinch County, Georgia
Transportation in Ware County, Georgia
Transportation in Pierce County, Georgia
Transportation in Wayne County, Georgia
Transportation in Long County, Georgia
Transportation in Liberty County, Georgia